Víctor Estrella was the defending champion but did not participate.
Paolo Lorenzi defeated Leonardo Mayer 7–6(7–5), 6–7(4–7), 6–4 in the final to win the title.

Seeds

Draw

Finals

Top half

Bottom half

References
 Main Draw
 Qualifying Draw

Seguros Bolivar Open Medellin - Singles
2012 Singles